Andrea De Rossi (born 8 August 1972 in Genova) is an Italian former rugby union footballer and a current coach. He played as number eight.

De Rossi first team was Rugby Livorno, where he played from 1990/91 to 1999/2000. He then went to represent Rugby Calvisano, from 2000/01 to 2003/04, then, as player-coach, Gran Parma Rugby, from 2003/04 to 2005/06, and Rugby Club I Cavalieri Prato, from 2006/07 to 2009/10. He won the Cup of Italy for Rugby Calvisano, in 2003/04.

De Rossi had 32 caps for Italy, from 1999 to 2004, scoring 10 points. He had his debut at the 1999 Rugby World Cup finals, in a match where he played as a substitute, with England. It was the only match he entered at the tournament. He was present again at the 2003 Rugby World Cup finals, this time as the captain, playing three matches.

The Italian back rower played four times at the Six Nations, in 2000, 2002, 2003 and 2004.

Quotes

"In rugby luck doesn't counts. What counts is the body, heart, intelligence and the will to fight."

External links

1972 births
Living people
Italian rugby union players
Italian rugby union coaches
Rugby union number eights
Italy international rugby union players
Cavalieri Prato players